Maria Pixell (died 1811) was a British landscape painter who worked in the medium of both oil paint and watercolor. She lived and worked in London, Hampshire and Maidenhead.
 
She exhibited her paintings between 1793 and 1811 at the Royal Academy of Arts and between 1809 and 1811 at the British Institution. A number of her paintings reside in the collection of, and are on display, at Arlington Court.

Notable collections

View of Old Arlington Church (St James's), Devon, 1783-1811, Arlington Court, National Trust

References

External links
 

1811 deaths
18th-century British painters
19th-century British painters
British women painters
Women watercolorists
19th-century British women artists